The Manor Academy is a co-educational secondary school with academy status in Mansfield Woodhouse, Nottinghamshire, overseen by and part of The Two Counties Trust.

Admissions
In 2017 61% of students at the Manor Academy gained a grade 4 or higher in English and mathematics studies. In addition to this, 92% of A-Level students also passed their subjects in 2017.

In 2013, the academy introduced a new curriculum for students; the Year 7 cohort studied New Basics which gradually introduces them to secondary education. Year 8, 9, 10 and 11 students followed the Manor Expressway, which allowed them to learn and be assessed at a rate that suits them, focusing on each student's stage of learning, not their age. On top of this, the academy was split into five strands; Strive, Voyage, Discovery, Enigma and New Basics.

Previous international links with Jin Cai High School in Shanghai meant that students at the Academy had the opportunity of a trip to China. However, this is no longer available.

The school has its own sports and recreation centre, a full sized all-weather sports pitch, a construction centre, an engineering workshop, a hair and beauty training salon, advanced ICT facilities, a comprehensive library, and the Manor Farm, which consists primarily of chickens, but is also used to grow different varieties of crops.

An investment in iPads for the whole school in 2014 also improved teaching by providing advanced tools to improve learning.

History

Grammar school
Manor Technical Grammar School was opened in 1959.

Comprehensive
The school was previously made up of the Forest View County Secondary Modern school on Park Hall Road, and a site on Yorke Street; however, following the destruction of large parts of the Park Hall Road site by fire in 1996, work was carried out to incorporate the school to a single site. This was achieved for the start of the 1999/2000 school year, and the Yorke Street site was demolished and sold for housing construction.

Academy status
The Manor School was selected by application to the office of the Secretary of State to become an Academy in 2011.

As of 1 September 2017, the Manor Academy became part of The Two Counties Trust. The CEO of the Two Counties Trust (Richard Vasey) also became the Executive Head Teacher until September 2018 when Katrina Kerry became Head Teacher.

Awards
The school has achieved several awards including Artsmark, Sportsmark Gold and Home Access. It provides a range of extended services. The on-site facilities for the Early Years Foundation Stage (EYFS) provide both crèche and physical activity sessions in a separate building at Manor Sport and Recreation Centre. Unfortunately this centre is no longer in use for early years and is used by Manor Academy as a teaching facility.

2018 Ofsted Inspection
In May 2018 the school was inspected by Ofsted and awarded a 'GOOD' rating for overall effectiveness and for all the 4 main categories, including Pupil Outcomes, Teaching & Learning, Behaviour and Leadership of the Academy. The inspection report states 'The quality of education has been transformed since the last section 5 inspection.'

The report also states that 'Highly effective leadership by the head of school has endured that previous weaknesses have been tackled decisively and effectively.'

Further comments from the report highlight the quality of teaching 'Some of the teaching is truly inspiring.' with the inspector noting 'This was a lesson I did not want to leave', and 'Parents and carers are increasingly confident about the quality of education provided by the school and they are right to be.'

Controversy

In late April 2016, three teachers were suspended following an April Fool's Day prank where Olbas Oil was introduced into a drink of tea, which caused a trainee teacher to be hospitalised for monitoring. The incident was reported to the local newspaper following school-gossip.

In early May, the school announced that the three suspended teachers had left "by mutual agreement", and, following the Ofsted report, "the school’s 900-plus students must come first".

Following the COVID-19 outbreak, The Two Counties Trust decided that the Manor Sport and Recreation Centre should not be opened to the public. They described it as 'unfeasible to reopen the outdoor facilities to the community'.

References

External links 
 Website

1959 establishments in England
Academies in Nottinghamshire
Educational institutions established in 1959
Mansfield District
Secondary schools in Nottinghamshire